WNVE is a radio station broadcasting at 98.7 MHz, from Culebra, Puerto Rico broadcasting a Contemporary Christian format. This station is owned by New Life Broadcasting, which licensee is held by Juan Carlos Matos Barreto (President & General Manager of the station).

On November 9, 2017, New Life Broadcasting (Juan Carlos Matos Barreto, president) files to swap WNVE/101.5 in Ceiba and a $1.2 million cash payment to Pura Palabra Media Group (Otoniel Font, president) in exchange for the then-WQML. Once the swap closes, will switch back to the original WNVE call letters and Nueva Vida FM Programming. According to the terms of the contract New Life will allow Pura Palabra Media to program the HD3 channel of WNVM as part of the deal in order to feed its San Juan-licensed translator W268BK at 101.5 FM which carries its Pura Palabra Radio programming. The sale was completed on May 24, 2018.

The station changed its call sign to WNVE on March 30, 2018.

References

External links

Radio stations established in 2012
2012 establishments in Puerto Rico
Contemporary Christian radio stations in Puerto Rico
Culebra, Puerto Rico